Josiah Frost House is a historic home located at Menallen Township, Fayette County, Pennsylvania.  It was built about 1816–1819, and is a two-story, rectangular, sandstone dwelling measuring 48 feet by 24 feet.  It is in a vernacular Federal style.  It was built as part of the Searight Tavern complex at Searight's Corners, an important stop for 19th-century travelers on the National Road.

It was added to the National Register of Historic Places in 1996.

The house pictured is opposite the site of the demolished Frost house, also known as the Searight House. The Frost house was on the north side of Route 40.

References

Houses on the National Register of Historic Places in Pennsylvania
Houses completed in 1819
Federal architecture in Pennsylvania
Houses in Fayette County, Pennsylvania
National Register of Historic Places in Fayette County, Pennsylvania